Alpha Gamma Rho, commonly known as AGR, is a social/professional, agriculture fraternity in the United States, currently with 71 collegiate chapters.

Founding
The fraternity considers the Morrill Act of 1862 to be the instrument of its inception. Having been signed by President Abraham Lincoln in 1862, it provided land and other financial supports to establish one institution of higher learning in the agricultural and mechanical sciences within each state.  Alpha Gamma Rho, referred to as "AGR", was founded when two local fraternities from Ohio State University (Alpha Gamma Rho, founded 1904) and the University of Illinois (Delta Rho Sigma, founded in 1906) met at an International Livestock Competition in Chicago.  Sixteen men originally signed the fraternity's charter at the Claypool Hotel in Indianapolis on April 4, 1908. Expansion increased dramatically over the next three decades to almost all land-grant universities in the country.  The first chapter at a non-land-grant university was chartered in 1958 at Arizona State University.  The first non-state (private) associated chapter (Beta Psi) was at Delaware Valley University in Doylestown, Pennsylvania.

The four pillars of Alpha Gamma Rho are recruitment, commitment, education, and recognition. These four pillars, built upon a firm foundation, support and maintain the integrity of our brotherhood. One of AGR’s earliest Grand President’s, S.K. Bjoronson (North Dakota) said, "I want her men to be leaders of the future, not because they are my Fraternity Brothers, but because I believe them to be the strongest of character and the most honorable and resolute of the times. I want each of them, by their deeds and actions, to justify the existence of Alpha Gamma Rho." The Brotherhood Covenant pillars make up the principles that Alpha Gamma Rho brothers are expected to live by. Once initiated, each member is required to sign the Covenant.

Notable alumni

Chapters

Local chapter or member misconduct

In 2015, the chapter at Fresno State University was suspended after an investigation of property damage with a firearm uncovered evidence of hazing and underage drinking. They were fully recognized again by the university in late 2017.

In 2016, the chapter at Oregon State University was suspended following multiple hazing and harassment violations dating back to 2012. The chapter can apply for reinstatement in 2021.

In 2018, the chapter at University of Minnesota was suspended after one of its members, Dylan Fulton, was found dead following a night of drinking. After an investigation, it was determined Fulton had died of alcohol poisoning.

See also
List of social fraternities and sororities
Professional fraternities and sororities

References

 
Student organizations established in 1904
Student societies in the United States
North American Interfraternity Conference
Agricultural organizations based in the United States
1904 establishments in Ohio